Hagop Vahram Çerçiyan was a professor of mathematics, geography, and calligraphy at the Robert College of Istanbul, known for designing the signature of Mustafa Kemal Atatürk, the first president of Turkey.

Life
Of Armenian descent, Hagop Vahram Çerçiyan was an educator. He travelled to the United States to study the Palmer Method, which by that time had gained widespread popularity. Çerçiyan was known for teaching this method during his career as a professor. He returned to Istanbul and became a professor of mathematics, geography, and calligraphy at the Robert College in Istanbul. Over his 40-year career at the Robert College, Çerçiyan taught less than 10,000 students.

Atatürk's signature 

During the initial years of the Turkish Republic and under the reforms of Atatürk, a Latin-based alphabet was introduced to replace the Perso-Turkic script then in use. As part of the reforms, Turkish citizens were also required to take up a last name under the Surname Law in 1934. Prior to this, Turkey's Christian and Jewish citizens were already using surnames, but Muslims did not use surnames. Muslims were generally referred by their social or professional titles such as "Pasha", "Hoca", "Bey", "Hanım", "Efendi", or their names were complemented with that of their father. Mustafa Kemal himself was required to take up a surname, and the Turkish Parliament gave him the surname Atatürk, meaning father of the Turks. Many members of parliament, including some of Çerçiyan's former students, suggested that Atatürk needed a new signature for his name. On a November morning in 1934, members of parliament presented the proposal to Çerçiyan, who accepted the task. That night, five model signatures were prepared and the following morning, police officers arrived to collect them. Atatürk personally selected the one of "K. Atatürk" from these five model signatures.

Legacy
According to Hagop Çerçiyan's son Dikran Çerçiyan, after the death of Atatürk in 1938, his father's contribution to Atatürk's signature risked being forgotten: "Some tried to introduce others as the creator of the signature. There were efforts to forget my father. But the truth always come[s] to the surface".

See also
Agop Dilâçar

References

Turkish people of Armenian descent
Turkish educators
Turkish calligraphers
Year of birth missing
Year of death missing